Francesco Maria Niccolò Gabburri (16 January 1676 – 1742) was a Florentine diplomat, painter, art collector, and biographer of artists.

Biography 
Niccolò Gabburri was a prominent broker for artists and collectors in Florence during the first half of the 18th century. He befriended Pierre-Jean Mariette and Pierre Crozat. He painted various works in Rome, including the dome of Santa Rita da Cascia alle Vergini. His collection of drawings and prints was bought by William Kent in 1758, and sold in London.

He served as a diplomat to Granduke Cosimo Medici III. He was named a knight of the Tuscan Order of Saint Stephen, and prince of the Accademia della Crusca and prefect of the Florentine Accademia delle Arti del Disegno starting in 1730. In Florence, he resided and presided over the decoration of the Palazzo Vivarelli Colonna.

He wrote an unpublished Vite de' pittori relating mainly biographical details of Florentine artists.

References

Bibliography

External links 
Vite Di Pittori
 

1676 births
1742 deaths
Diplomats from Florence
Italian art historians